Rapid Boot is an EFI BIOS alternative using a Linux kernel (in the BIOS flash part) developed by Intel Corporation, primarily intended for computer clusters.

See also 
 Coreboot
 Das U-Boot

References
 Anton Borisov (6 January 2009) The Open Source BIOS is Ten. An interview with the coreboot developers, The H

External links 
 

BIOS